Captain Hugh Abercrombie Anderson MBE (10 February 1890 – 9 November 1965) was a Newfoundland writer.

Born in St. John's, Anderson was the son of politician, John Anderson. Following an education at Bishop Feild College and Edinburgh Academy, the first few years of his career were at the family business in St. John's, after which Anderson entered the military and rose to the rank of Captain. In 1921 he became manager of a theatrical business in New York City owned by his brother John Murray Anderson, a director and producer.  Anderson's dramatization of Robert Louis Stevenson's The Suicide Club received favourable reviews in 1929. He also co-authored the libretto for Lola Carrier Worrell's musical Babylonia.

Under the pen name of Hugh Abercrombie he wrote the musical Auld Lang Syne, and in 1954 he published, under his own name, Out Without My Rubbers, the memoirs of John Murray Anderson.

Anderson was made MBE. He died at his home in Queens, New York.

See also
 List of people of Newfoundland and Labrador
 List of communities in Newfoundland and Labrador

References

1890 births
1965 deaths
People educated at Edinburgh Academy
20th-century Canadian dramatists and playwrights
Members of the Order of the British Empire
Anderson, Hugh, Aber
Dominion of Newfoundland people
Writers from St. John's, Newfoundland and Labrador
Bishop Feild School alumni
Canadian male dramatists and playwrights
20th-century Canadian male writers